is a Japanese manga artist. He writes under a pen name in which his first name Yoshihiro is spelled out in hiragana (よしひろ).

Takahashi was born September 18, 1953, in Higashinaruse, Akita. He was very interested in drawing coming of age related themes, and, in the 1960s, started publishing small comics in several newspapers and magazines. His first manga was Shitamachi Benkei, but his breakthrough came in 1984 when he published the popular manga Silver Fang -The Shooting Star Gin-, also known as Silver Fang, or Silver Fang Legend Gin, the story about a dog who goes in search of other dogs to fight a bear named Akakabuto. He got the idea in 1980 when he read an article about domestic dogs that ran away from their owners and lived as wild dogs in the mountains. The pure idea fascinated him, which led him to create the manga about the puppy. In 1987, the series won the Shogakukan Manga Award for shōnen manga.

Takahashi started to publish the sequel, Weed, in 1999 and it soon became a hit as well as an anime which aired on September 17, 2005. He has been touted as the first manga artist to draw manga featuring a puppy as hero.

Takahashi was the guest of honour at the Finnish role-playing and anime fan convention Tracon in Tampere on September 3 and 4 2011. It was his first visit to Finland and most likely his first time being a guest of honour outside Japan; he visited Finland for the second time in 2012, participating in the Animecon event in Kuopio.

Bibliography

Manga
Genkotsu Boy (げんこつボーイ) (1974)
Akutare Kiyojin (Giants) (悪たれ巨人 (ジャイアンツ)) (1976) Also known as Rowdyism Giant.
Shiroi Senshi Yamato (白い戦士ヤマト) (1978)
Otoko no Tabidachi (男の旅立ち) (1981)
Aozora Fishing (青空フィッシング) (1982)
Tosaō (土佐王) (1982)
Sho to Daichi (翔と大地) (1983)
Silver Fang -The Shooting Star Gin- (銀牙流れ星銀) (1983)
Kacchū no Senshi Gamu (甲冑の戦士 雅武) (1988)
Great Horse (グレートホース) (1990)
Drunk! (どらんく!) (2002)
Ama Kakeru Toki (天翔ける瞬間) (1991)
Byakuren no Fangu (白蓮のファング) (1993)
Takahashi Yoshihiro no Inu to Kurashitai (高橋よしひろのイヌと暮らしたい) (1994)
Shōnen to Inu (少年と犬) (1994) Re-issued 1996 under the name Ginga no Inutachi [Shōnen to Inu] Remix (銀牙の犬たち [少年と犬] リミックス).
Kotō no Bōkensha (孤島の冒険者) (1995)
Kyōko no Shura (恭子の修羅) (1995) Serialized in the Champion Jack manga magazine.
FANG (1998)
Kandō Ō Retsuden 2 (感動王列伝 2) (1998)
Ichi Geki (一撃) (1999)
Weed (銀牙伝説ウィード) (1999)
Ginga Densetsu Riki (銀牙伝説リキ) (2000)
Ginga Seiken Densetsu Meteor Gin (銀牙聖犬伝説 Meteor Gin) (2000) A databook of Silver Fang -The Shooting Star Gin-.
Lassie (ラッシー) (2001)
Taishi – Haruka Naru Michi (大志 - 遥かなる道) (2001)
Boku no Inu, Boku no Weed (ぼくの犬僕のウィード) (2001)
Ginga Densetsu Weed Gaiden (銀牙伝説ウィード外伝) (2001)
Ginga Densetsu Weed Gengashū (銀牙伝説ウィード 原画集) (2002) An artbook of Weed.
Ginga Densetsu Weed Meishōbu Retsuden (銀牙伝説ウィード - 名勝負列伝) (2003) A databook of Weed.
Gajō no Kettō Hen (牙城の血闘編) (2005) A compilation of the first five volumes of Weed manga.
Ginga Densetsu Weed Tokubetsu Han (銀牙伝説ウィード特別版) (2005) A Ginga Densetsu Weed Gaiden and Ginga Densetsu Riki conjunct volume.
Ginga Nagareboshi Gin Shin Gaiden (銀牙流れ星銀 真・外伝) (2009)
Ginga Densetsu Weed: Orion (銀牙伝説ウィードオリオン) (2009)
Ginga Densetsu Weed Special Tabidachi Hen (銀牙伝説ウィードスペシャル 旅立ち編) (2009)  
Ginga Densetsu Weed Special Senshi no Shōmei Hen (銀牙伝説ウィードスペシャル 戦士の証明編) (2009)
Ginga Densetsu Weed Special Inuzoku no Tsutome Hen (銀牙伝説ウィードスペシャル 犬族の務め編) (2009)
Ginga Densetsu Weed Special Otoko no Yakusoku Hen (銀牙伝説ウィードスペシャル 男の約束編) (2009)
Ginga Densetsu Weed Special Taiman Shōbu Hen (銀牙伝説ウィードスペシャル タイマン勝負編) (2010)
Ginga Densetsu Weed Special Taishō no Utsuwa Hen (銀牙伝説ウィードスペシャル 大将の器編) (2010)
Ginga Densetsu Weed Special Dōshu Taiketsu Hen (銀牙伝説ウィードスペシャル 同種対決編) (2010)
Ginga Densetsu Weed Special Uketsuga Reshi Kiba Hen (銀牙伝説ウィードスペシャル 受け継がれし牙編) (2010)
Ginga Nagareboshi Gin Shin Gaiden 2(銀牙ー流れ星銀ー真・外伝 2) (2010)
Ginga Densetsu Anju to Jirōmaru (銀牙伝説 杏樹と次郎丸) (2011) Serialized in Bessatsu Manga Goraku 
Ginga Densetsu Weed Best Selection Sai (1)(銀牙伝説ウィードベストセレクション最 1) (2013) First part of republication of specific story arc of GWeed manga.
Ginga Densetsu Weed Best Selection Sai (2)(銀牙伝説ウィードベストセレクション最 2) (2013) Second part of republication of specific story arc of Weed manga.
Ginga Densetsu Weed Best Selection Hou (1)(銀牙伝説ウィードベストセレクション 法 1)(2014) First part of republication of specific story arc of Weed manga.
Ginga Densetsu Weed Best Selection Hou (2)(銀牙伝説ウィードベストセレクション 法 2)(2015) Second part of republication of specific story arc of Weed manga.
Ginga Densetsu Akame (銀牙伝説　赤目) (2014)
Ginga: The Last Wars (銀牙〜THE LAST WARS〜) (2015)
Ginga Densetsu Noah (銀牙伝説ノア) (2019)

Short stories
Shitamachi Benkei (下町弁慶) (1971) Included as an extra story in Genkotsu Boy vol. 4.
Tosaō (土佐王) Included in a compilation book of the same name.
Revenger (リベンジャー) Included in the Tosaō story compilation.
Fire's Funsensu (ファイヤーズ奮戦す) Included in the Tosaō story compilation.
Rō Ō (老王) Included in the Tosaō story compilation.
Itoshi no Dino (愛しのディーノ) Included as an extra story in Kacchū no Senshi Gamu's first publication's vol. 2.
Hanako to Kurasu (花子と暮らす) Included in Takahashi Yoshihiro no Inu to Kurashitai.
Nagare Ashi'''(?) (流れ挙士) Included as an extra story in Otoko no Tabidachi vol. 6.Saraba! Kita no Ōkami (さらば ! 北の狼) Included as an extra story in Otoko no Tabidachi vol. 6.Bear Hunter – Fubuki-gō (ベアハンター吹雪号) A story about Yamato's father Fubuki, included as an extra story in Ama Kakeru Toki vol. 2.Hakugin no Teiō (白銀の帝王) A story about the characters of Shiroi Senshi Yamato, included as an extra story in Ama Kakeru Toki vol. 3.Black Cobra (ブラック コブラ) Included as an extra story in Ama Kakeru Toki vol. 3.Moon Kid' (ムーンキッド) Included as an extra story in Shiroi Senshi Yamato 1st publication's vol. 26 ja 2nd publication's vol. 14.Kubiwa - Shōnen to Inu (首輪-少年と犬) Included in the Shōnen to Inu story compilation.Sensei no Inu (先生の犬) Included in the Shōnen to Inu story compilation.Lead - Seinen to Inu (糸岡 (リード) - 青年と犬) Included in the Shōnen to Inu story compilation.Honō no Inu (炎の犬) Included in the Shōnen to Inu story compilation.Obāsan no Inu (おばあさんの犬) Included in the Shōnen to Inu story compilation.Amígo · Ken (アミーゴ · 犬) Included in the Shōnen to Inu story compilation.Shiroi Yamainu (白い山犬) Included in the Shōnen to Inu  story compilation and in Silver Fang -The Shooting Star Gin- 5th publication's vol. 6.Fureai Story – Yūta to Shiro (ふれあい ストーリー – ゆうたとシロ) Included in the book Boku no Inu, Boku no Weed.Wagaya no Mel (我が家のメル) Included in the book Boku no Inu, Boku no Weed.HANAKO Included in the Ginga Densetsu Weed Gaiden] story compilation.Lonely Ron (ロンリーロン) Two stories with the same name. The other is included in the Ginga Densetsu Weed Gaiden story compilation and the other in Ginga Nagareboshi Gin Shin Gaiden story compilation.Shion no Kaze (シオンの疾風) Included in the Ginga Densetsu Weed Gaiden story compilation.Mel no Tabidachi (メルの旅立ち) Included in the Ginga Densetsu Weed Gaiden story compilation.Ganin (牙忍) Published in the Comic Jidai Katsugeki manga magazine.Kai no san kyōdai (甲斐の三兄弟) Published in the Business Jump manga magazine and included in the Ginga Nagareboshi Gin Shin Gaiden story compilation.Chōmon no Tabi (弔問の旅) Published in the Business Jump manga magazine and included in the Ginga Nagareboshi Gin Shin Gaiden story compilation.Karadaki no Tomon (枯滝の十文) Published in the Business Jump manga magazineShin Gaiden Benizakura Hen (真外伝紅桜編) Published in the Business Jump manga magazineFurukawa Masaaki Monogatari – Kowareta Radio (古川昌明物語 –壊れたラジオ–) Published in the Weekly Shōnen Sunday manga magazine in 1994.J-League no Kaze  (other details unknown)Grand Slam'' (other details unknown)

References

External links

1953 births
Living people
Manga artists from Akita Prefecture